Symphlebia suanoides is a moth in the subfamily Arctiinae. It was described by Schaus in 1921. It can be found in Costa Rica.

References

Moths described in 1921
Symphlebia